The Mod Club Theatre (commonly called Mod Club) was an entertainment venue in Toronto that operated from 2002 to 2020. Its address was 722 College Street, which is in the city's Little Italy neighbourhood.

Founded by Platinum Blonde frontman Mark Holmes and fellow English-expat Bobbi Guy, the venue hosted live performances and DJ nights.

Overview
Mod Club Theatre had a 618 person capacity and a stage that was 24 feet wide x 18 feet deep.  Its interior was accented with murals featuring images of 1960s mod subculture. Concert-goers could watch acts from the floor, the tables to the side of the room, or the second floor balcony. Additionally, two large video panels gave audience members views of the performers on stage.

The Mod Club featured theme nights such as ska nights, and Velvet Goldmine nights featuring glam music. Holmes also deejayed at the club under the name DJ MRK, with set lists featuring genres such as hip hop, electroclash, dance-punk and other forms of alternative dance music.

History
During a hiatus from Platinum Blonde, Mark Holmes, along with former Platinum Blonde drummer Sascha Tukatsch and musician Dave Barrett, formed a band called Vertigo, which later became known as No. 9. Described by C. J. O'Connor of the Toronto Star as "pre-inflatable-pig Pink Floyd, powered by Marshall/clothed by Galliano," the band's sound was inspired by the music of the late 1960–early 1970 London rock scene. The band was not finding any labels to take them on, so in 1996 Holmes began to organize once-monthly club events, called "Orange Alert". The "Orange Alert" events were inspired by happenings of the 1960s and got their name from the alert that sounded whenever penal colonists attempted an escape during of the 1960s, British TV series, The Prisoner.

In 1999 these happenings were rebranded as "Mod Club" nights, which were held Thursdays at the Toronto nightclub, Lava Lounge. Due to the popularity of these shows, Holmes and partner, Bobbi Guy (a fellow British-expat who managed the Toronto record store Sam the Record Man,) added Mod Club shows on Saturdays at the nightclub Revival, which was situated in a former Baptist church. Attendees of these club nights dressed in mod-inspired fashions. Mod Club nights incorporated R&B, funk and soul music from the 1960s, music from the mod revival scenes of the 1970s and 1980s as well as 1990s Britpop.

In 2002 Holmes and Guy established the Mod Club Theatre in a venue that was previously a pool hall called Corner Pocket. Holmes convinced the venue's owner, Bruno Sinopoli, to convert it into a nightclub venue. Holmes deejayed at the club under the name DJ MRK and from 2003 to 2007 his Thursday night shows were broadcast live from 102.1 The Edge. 

The venue opened with a focus on British musical artists and hosted live performances by artists such as Amy Winehouse, Muse, New Order and Keane. Other performers that played at the club included The Killers, Metric, Calvin Harris, The Lumineers,  Sia, John Mayer, Florence + the Machine, Cypress Hill, Yukon Blonde, Noel Gallagher's High Flying Birds and Lana Del Rey. The Weeknd referred to the nightclub as "the stage that changed my life," having performed his first live concert there in 2011.

The Mod Club came to an end in 2020, having been financially affected by COVID-19 lockdowns. The concert venue reopened under the name The Axis Club in late 2021.

References

External links
The Mod Club (copy archived February 18, 2020)

Former theatres in Canada
Impact of the COVID-19 pandemic on the performing arts
Music venues in Toronto
Nightclubs in Toronto